Until 1 January 2007 Vamdrup municipality was a municipality (Danish, kommune) in the former Vejle County on the Jutland peninsula in southeast Denmark.  The municipality covered an area of 102 km2, and had a total population of 7,456 (2005).  Its last mayor was Mike Legarth, a member of the Conservative People's Party (Det Konservative Folkeparti).

The main city and the site of its municipal council was the town of Vamdrup.

 Hjarup Parish
 Vamdrup Parish
 Ødis Parish

Vamdrup municipality ceased to exist as the result of Kommunalreformen ("The Municipality Reform" of 2007).  It was merged with Christiansfeld, Kolding, and  Lunderskov municipalities to form a new Kolding municipality.  This created a municipality with an area of 640 km2 and a total population of 86,102 (2005).  The new municipality belongs to Region of Southern Denmark. There is a small airport called Vamdrup Kolding Airport, were Danish Air Transport is based.

External links 
 Kolding municipality's official website (Danish only)

References 
 Municipal statistics: NetBorger Kommunefakta, delivered from KMD aka Kommunedata (Municipal Data)
 Municipal mergers and neighbors: Eniro new municipalities map

Former municipalities of Denmark